Nine Romanian gymnasts (7 women and 2 men) currently have gymnastics elements named after them.

Women's Artistic Gymnastics

Nadia Comăneci
 Comăneci salto (uneven bars)
 Comăneci dismount (uneven bars) 
 Comăneci layout (uneven bars)

Daniela Silivaș
 Silivaș mount (balance beam) 
 Silivaș (floor)

Celestina Popa
 Popa (floor)

Cristina Elena Grigoraș
 Grigoraș (balance beam)

Sabina Cojocar
 Cojocar (floor)

Diana Bulimar
 Bulimar (floor)

Simona Amânar
 Amanar (vault)

Men's Artistic Gymnastics

Marian Drăgulescu
 Drăgulescu (vault)
 Drăgulescu piked (vault)

Marius Urzică
 Urzică (parallel bars)
 Urzică (pommel horse)

External links
 2021 – 2024 CODE OF POINTS Women’s Artistic Gymnastics
 2017 – 2020 CODE OF POINTS Women’s Artistic Gymnastics
 2021 CODE OF POINTS MEN’S ARTISTIC GYMNASTICS

References 

Artistic gymnastics
Gymnastics elements
Lists of things named after people